Bertwin Hilliard "Belting Bert" Wilson (October 17, 1949 – February 28, 1992) was a professional ice hockey player who played 478 games in the National Hockey League with the New York Rangers, St. Louis Blues, Los Angeles Kings, and Calgary Flames between 1974 and 1981.

He died on February 28, 1992, of stomach cancer at the age of 42.

Career statistics

Regular season and playoffs

External links 
 

1949 births
1992 deaths
Buffalo Bisons (AHL) players
Calgary Flames players
Canadian ice hockey left wingers
Deaths from colorectal cancer
Ice hockey people from Ontario
London Knights players
London Nationals players
Los Angeles Kings players
New York Rangers draft picks
New York Rangers players
Omaha Knights (CHL) players
People from Orangeville, Ontario
Providence Reds players
St. Louis Blues players
Salt Lake Golden Eagles (CHL) players